Howard Dallmar (May 24, 1922 – December 19, 1991) was an American professional basketball player and coach.

A  forward from San Francisco, California, Dallmar played collegiately at Stanford University. He led Stanford to the 1942 NCAA Championship, earning Tournament Most Outstanding Player honors. After transferring to Penn, he was an All-American selection in 1945.

From 1946 to 1949, he played professionally for the Philadelphia Warriors of the Basketball Association of America (a forerunner to the NBA). Dallmar was the third leading scorer (behind Joe Fulks and Angelo Musi) on the team which won the 1947 BAA Championship. In the 1947–48 season, Dallmar led the BAA in total assists and was named to the  All-BAA First Team.

Dallmar coached the University of Pennsylvania basketball team from 1948 to 1954, before returning to Stanford as head basketball coach in 1954. He remained at Stanford for 21 seasons, compiling a 256–264 record. He died of congestive heart failure in 1991.

BAA career statistics

Regular season

Playoffs

Head coaching record

References

External links
 Professional statistics
 New York Times obituary

1922 births
1991 deaths
All-American college men's basketball players
American men's basketball coaches
American men's basketball players
Basketball coaches from California
Basketball players from San Francisco
College men's basketball head coaches in the United States
Penn Quakers men's basketball coaches
Penn Quakers men's basketball players
Philadelphia Warriors players
Power forwards (basketball)
Stanford Cardinal men's basketball coaches
Stanford Cardinal men's basketball players